Vashkan Chan (also Romanized as Vashkān Chān; also known as Vāshkān Jān, Vashkānjān, and Vashkonchān) is a village in Ashar Rural District, Ashar District, Mehrestan County, Sistan and Baluchestan Province, Iran. At the 2006 census, its population was 813, in 139 families.

References 

Populated places in Mehrestan County